Allium crenulatum, common name Olympic onion, is a plant species native to Oregon, Washington, and British Columbia. It grows in the Cascades, the Coast Ranges, the Olympic Mountains, the Wenatchee Mountains, and the mountains on Vancouver Island. There is one report from Alabama, but this needs verification. The species grows on talus slopes and in alpine tundra at elevations of 600–2500 m.

Allium crenulatum produces ovoid bulbs up to 2 cm long, formed on rhizomes some distance from the parent bulb. Its leaves are flat, up to 35 cm long, sometimes with minute teeth along the margins. Scape is flattened and winged, up to 15 cm tall. Umbel is compact, with up to 25 flowers. Flowers bell-shaped, up to 13 mm across; tepals pink with darker pink midveins; anthers yellow or purple; pollen yellow.

References

External links

Onions
crenulatum
Flora of Oregon
Flora of British Columbia
Flora of Washington (state)
Plants described in 1899
Olympic National Park
Vancouver Island